The 1st Signal Command was a Signal Corps command of the United States Army, based at Fort Riley between 1967 and 1969.

History
The command was constituted on 19 April 1967 in the Regular Army as Headquarters and Headquarters Company, 1st Signal Command, and activated at Fort Riley on 25 April 1967. Based at Camp Funston, the command was subordinate to the headquarters of the 23rd Field Army Support Command. It was inactivated in March 1969.

Heraldic items

Shoulder sleeve insignia

 Description: On an orange disc within a  white border  overall, three white rings graduating in size and having a common tangent at the base, the smallest circle surrounding a blue roundel all surmounted by a vertical blue lightning flash issuing from lower border and extending to top border.
Symbolism:
 The blue lightning streak on target symbolizes the 1st Signal Command's ability to carry on all functions of its mission with speed and accuracy.
 The white rings refer to the emanating effect of transmitting radio waves through space.
 The single lightning flash (1) further distinguishes the 1st Signal Command.
 Orange and white are colors used by the Signal Corps.

Background: The shoulder sleeve insignia was approved on 24 July 1968.

Citations

Bibliography 

001